This is a summary of map projections that have articles of their own on Wikipedia or that are otherwise notable. Because there is no limit to the number of possible map projections, there can be no comprehensive list.

Table of projections

*The first known popularizer/user and not necessarily the creator.

Key

Type of projection surface
 Cylindrical In normal aspect, these map regularly-spaced meridians to equally spaced vertical lines, and parallels to horizontal lines.
 Pseudocylindrical In normal aspect, these map the central meridian and parallels as straight lines. Other meridians are curves (or possibly straight from pole to equator), regularly spaced along parallels.
 Conic In normal aspect, conic (or conical) projections map meridians as straight lines, and parallels as arcs of circles.
 Pseudoconical In normal aspect, pseudoconical projections represent the central meridian as a straight line, other meridians as complex curves, and parallels as circular arcs.
 Azimuthal In standard presentation, azimuthal projections map meridians as straight lines and parallels as complete, concentric circles. They are radially symmetrical. In any presentation (or aspect), they preserve directions from the center point. This means great circles through the central point are represented by straight lines on the map.
 Pseudoazimuthal In normal aspect, pseudoazimuthal projections map the equator and central meridian to perpendicular, intersecting straight lines. They map parallels to complex curves bowing away from the equator, and meridians to complex curves bowing in toward the central meridian. Listed here after pseudocylindrical as generally similar to them in shape and purpose.
 Other Typically calculated from formula, and not based on a particular projection
 Polyhedral maps Polyhedral maps can be folded up into a polyhedral approximation to the sphere, using particular projection to map each face with low distortion.

Properties
 Conformal Preserves angles locally, implying that local shapes are not distorted and that local scale is constant in all directions from any chosen point.
 Equal-area Area measure is conserved everywhere.
 Compromise Neither conformal nor equal-area, but a balance intended to reduce overall distortion.
 Equidistant All distances from one (or two) points are correct. Other equidistant properties are mentioned in the notes.
 Gnomonic All great circles are straight lines.
 Retroazimuthal Direction to a fixed location B (by the shortest route) corresponds to the direction on the map from A to B.

See also 

 360 video projection
 List of national coordinate reference systems
 Snake Projection

Notes

Further reading